Stephen Lo Wai-chung  was the Commissioner of Police of the Hong Kong Police Force. He began service in the police in 1984 and served as Commissioner of Police from May 2015 until his retirement in November 2019.

Biography
Lo attended the University of Hong Kong and studied Social Sciences. After he graduated, Lo joined the Royal Hong Kong Police Force on 16 July 1984 as an inspector and was promoted to Senior Inspector on 1 November 1987. He worked at the Regional Crime Unit and Organised Crime and Triad Bureau. He is specialised in "criminal investigation, international liaison, service quality management, security and operational duties," according to the government official website. He also helped the police to develop the first-generation Major Incident and Disaster Support System.

In 1999, he was seconded to the Interpol General Secretariat in Lyon, France, initially as Liaison Officer. In 2001, he was promoted to assistant director of its Asia and South Pacific Branch. Lo returned to Hong Kong in 2002 to take the position of senior superintendent in the Service Quality Wing and the Complaints Against Police Office. In 2005, he was promoted to chief superintendent in the Security Wing and Deputy Regional Commander in Kowloon West. In 2009, he was promoted to Assistant Commissioner of Police of the Security Wing. He held the position for two years until he was appointed Senior Assistant Commissioner of Police of the Crime and Security Wing in 2011. On 13 August 2013, he was promoted to Deputy Commissioner of Police, Operations in 2013 and then was transferred to Deputy Commissioner of Police, Management one year after.

Lo has also completed a few overseas training programmes, including the command course for police chiefs from the Chinese People's Public Security University in 2004, a management course for senior government officials from Harvard University in 2007, and a leadership development programme from the National Executive Institute of the Federal Bureau of Investigation in the United States in 2010. He also obtained a master's degree in Risk, Crisis & Disaster Management.

He was awarded the Police Meritorious Service Medal in 2009 and the Police Distinguished Service Medal in 2014.

On 4 May 2015, the State Council of the People's Republic of China appointed Lo Commissioner of Police, succeeding Andy Tsang Wai-hung. He was criticised as "soft" and "feeble" by frontline officers after he announced an investigation into the firing of two warning shots by a police officer during the 2016 Mong Kok civil unrest.

On 15 February 2017, Lo stated that he was "saddened" by the guilty verdict of seven police officers who were found guilty of assaulting the pro-democracy activist Ken Tsang during the Occupy Central protests.

In November 2019, Lo retired as Commissioner of Police amidst criticisms of the police's handling of the 2019–20 Hong Kong protests.

In August 2020, Lo and ten other officials were sanctioned by the United States Department of the Treasury under Executive Order 13936 by President Trump for undermining Hong Kong's autonomy.

On 10 February 2021, Carrie Lam awarded Lo the Chief Executive's Commendation for Government/Public Service for his "significant contribution to combatting the social disturbance in 2019 and safeguarding national security".

References

 

 
 
 

1961 births
Living people
Alumni of the University of Hong Kong
Government officials of Hong Kong
Hong Kong civil servants
Hong Kong Police commissioners
Individuals sanctioned by the United States under the Hong Kong Autonomy Act